Koi Aap Sa is a 2005 Indian Hindi romance film directed by Partho Mitra. It stars Aftab Shivdasani, Dipannita Sharma and Anita Hassanandani in pivotal roles. It was released on October 14, 2005.

Plot 
Rohan and Simi are childhood friends. Rohan likes a girl from college named Preeti and Simi helps bring Rohan and Preeti closer. However, Preeti feels awkward, insecure and jealous; because she feels Rohan and Simi's friendship is getting in the way. At this point, Simi's fiancé Vicky enters with his good friend Ranjit, Preeti comes to find out that Vicky is Simi's fiancé and that they're engagement party is to be held tomorrow. At the engagement party Simi dances with Vicky and Rohan dances with Preeti. After the engagement party Vicky flies out on a business trip, whilst Rohan, Simi and Preeti attend a party. At the party, whilst Rohan and Preeti are dancing, Ranjit visits Simi, he says he was on the way to the airport but wanted to give Simi a gift before he left, as her family looked after him very well during his trip in India. Ranjit says he left the gift in the cab and persuades Simi to follow him to the cab to get the gift. However, before they could reach the cab, Ranjit pushes Simi into a spare room and brutally rapes her. Simi calls out Rohan's name but by the time Rohan comes, it's too late. Rohan chases the cab that Ranjit is in, but Ranjit's cab meets with an accident and Ranjit dies. Simi doesn't tell Vicky and wants to wait to tell him in person. Whilst on the way to pick Vicky from the airport, Simi is on the phone with Rohan, when she has an accident. At the hospital, the Doctor tells Rohan that Simi is pregnant and abortion shouldn't be considered as it is very risky, which Vicky overhears. No one believes, Simi when she tells them that Ranjit raped her, Simi's parents and Vicky blame Rohan and Vicky calls off the engagement and leaves. Rohan decides to accept Simi and the baby and proposes to her to save her from humiliation; they get engaged. Just as the wedding is approaching, and Simi is heavily pregnant, Vicky returns. He realized he was wrong and asks for a second chance, Simi agrees. Rohan pretends to be happy for Simi, but he's really heartbroken, as he truly loves Simi. At Rohan's football match, Simi explains to Vicky that they're only pretending to be a couple, so that Rohan and Preeti can get back together. Preeti enters and tells Simi that Rohan loves Simi and only Simi. At this point, Simi gets labour pains and everyone rushes her to the hospital. Simi gives birth to a baby girl and when the nurse asks who the father is she says Rohan's name. After this, both Simi and Rohan are together.

Cast
 Aftab Shivdasani...Rohan Badola 
 Anita Hassanandani...Simran "Simi" Ghosh
 Dipannita Sharma...Preeti Chauhan
 Himanshu Malik...Vicky Kasliwal
 Advait Vaidya...Samir ‘Sam’ Ali
 Pushy Anand...Vicky's mom
 Zabyn Khan (item number in Aadat Ho Chuki Song)
 Shama Deshpande...Sumati - Simran's mom
 Rajendra Gupta...Mahesh Gupta - Simran's dad
 Manoj Joshi...Pratap Rehan
 Gautam Kapoor...Ranjeet Das
 Sushmita Mukherjee...Dolly
 Anil Nagrath...Vicky's dad
 Himani Shivpuri...Mrs. Neha Bakshi
 Pushtiie Shakti...Pinky

Soundtrack

All music was composed by Himesh Reshammiya. Lyrics were by Sameer

References

External links

2000s Hindi-language films
2005 films
Films scored by Himesh Reshammiya
Balaji Motion Pictures films
Films about rape in India